The New Roads–St. Francisville Ferry was a ferry service that connected Louisiana Highway 10 across the Mississippi River between New Roads and St. Francisville, Louisiana, United States. The normal operating hours for the 35-car ferry were 5 am to 9 pm, daily.

History
The ferry was shut down on May 5, 2011, as the John James Audubon Bridge was opened early due to concerns about rising flood waters.

See also
List of crossings of the Lower Mississippi River

References

Ferries of Louisiana
Ferries of the Mississippi River